Huub Broers (born 5 December 1951 in Voeren) is a Belgian politician and since 2000 elected by the ruling Voerbelangen party as burgemeester of Voeren. He represented CD&V until 14 July 2010, thereafter, he became affiliated to the New Flemish Alliance. He was co-opted as a member of the Belgian Senate on that day.

Notes

1951 births
Living people
Members of the Senate (Belgium)
New Flemish Alliance politicians
People from Voeren
21st-century Belgian politicians